Kill Reality is a 2005 series which ran on E! Entertainment television about the all-stars of reality television making a horror movie called The Scorned.  During the filming of the movie the cast lived together in a house that quickly turned into the real house of horrors. The series ended when on the final episode Jon "Jonny Fairplay" Dalton was removed from the house for defecating on Trish Schneider's bed while she was sleeping in it.

E! was supposed to have aired The Scorned on September 24, 2005, however, the film was delayed and had its premiere on Halloween later that year.

The Cast 
The show's stars consist of "actors" and "producers" all of whom took part in reality television:

Steven Hill of The Real World: Las Vegas
Tonya Cooley of The Real World: Chicago
Jon Dalton of Survivor: Pearl Islands
Reichen Lehmkuhl of The Amazing Race 4
Trishelle Cannatella of The Real World: Las Vegas
Trish Schneider of The Bachelor
Stacie Jones Upchurch of The Apprentice (US Season 2)
Bob Guiney of The Bachelor
Ethan Zohn of Survivor: Africa and Survivor: All-Stars
Jenna Morasca of Survivor: The Amazon and Survivor: All-Stars
Toni Ferrari of Love Cruise and Paradise Hotel
Erika Landin of Big Brother 4 (USA)
Katie Doyle of Road Rules: The Quest
Rob Cesternino of Survivor: The Amazon and Survivor: All-Stars

References 

E! original programming
2005 American television series debuts
2005 American television series endings
English-language television shows
2000s American reality television series
Television shows set in California